KJEF-CA, VHF analog channel 13, was a low-powered, Class A independent station television station licensed to Jennings, Louisiana, United States. The station was the only television station owned by Townsquare Media, a company that otherwise specializes exclusively in radio.

History
The station's original construction permit was originally granted on August 24, 1987, as K13VD; this was changed to K13VG a month later. The station was originally owned by Jennings Broadcasting Company along with KJEF radio (1290 AM, now KJEF; and 92.9 FM, now KHLA), but was sold to Cajun Country Broadcasting in 1994. K13VG was again sold, this time to Apex Broadcasting, in 2000; soon afterward, it obtained class A status and, in 2001, changed its call letters to KJEF-CA to match its radio sisters.

From March 15 until August 24, 2004, KJEF-CA suspended its normal programming and became, in effect, a temporary translator of KPLC, the NBC affiliate in Lake Charles; that station's tower had collapsed on March 4, and KJEF helped augment the lower-power auxiliary transmitter KPLC was broadcasting from upon resuming broadcasts on March 6.

Gap Broadcasting purchased Apex Broadcasting's Lafayette stations in 2007. What eventually became Gap Central Broadcasting (following the formation of GapWest Broadcasting) was folded into Townsquare Media on August 13, 2010.

The station went dark at 5 p.m. Friday, April 19, 2013. On April 22, 2013, Townsquare surrendered the station's license to the Federal Communications Commission, who subsequently cancelled it.

References

External links

Television channels and stations established in 1989
Defunct television stations in the United States
Television channels and stations disestablished in 2013
1989 establishments in Louisiana
2013 disestablishments in Louisiana
Defunct mass media in Louisiana